Reload is a 2019 Sri Lankan Sinhala comedy thriller film directed by Susantha Dharmapriya and co-produced by Kamal Dharmapriya, Mahinda Uduwana and Dhammika Priyadarshana. It stars Kumara Thirimadura, Dilhani Ekanayake in lead roles along with Roshan Pilapitiya and Tharuka Wanniarachchi. Music co-composed by Roshan Thisera and Kapila Maddegoda.

Plot

Cast
 Kumara Thirimadura as Sadasarana Mudalige Alapatha
 Dilhani Ekanayake as Princy, Alapatha's wife
 Giriraj Kaushalya as Lekam
 Harith Wasala as Roy Alapatha, Alapatha's son
 Tharuka Wanniarachchi as Chaya, Yama's daughter
 Roshan Pilapitiya as Yama King
 Gayathri Dias as Tricksy
 Teddy Vidyalankara as Bonny
 Sarath Chandrasiri as driver Sanath Vipuladeva
 Mahinda Pathirage as Music teacher
 D.B. Gangodathenna as Doctor
 Hemantha Eriyagama as Police sergeant
 Chathura Perera as Alapatha's bodyguard
 Nandana Hettiarachchi as Drunken person
 Rajasinghe Loluwagoda as Buddhist monk
 Manjula Moragaha as Sampath
 Ariyasena Gamage as God beseecher
 Keerthi Bandara as Astrologer in hell
 Jeevan Handunneththi as Bus conductor
 Sanet Dikkumbura as Kapuwa

Songs
The film consists with four songs.

References

External links
 

2019 films
2010s Sinhala-language films